Fredonia is a city in and the county seat of Wilson County, Kansas, United States.  As of the 2020 census, the population of the city was 2,151.  The city was founded in 1868, and saw considerable expansion in the early 20th century, with a fossil fuel boom.

History

Fredonia was laid out in 1868 near a large hillock located along the St. Louis & San Francisco Railway in southeast Kansas. It was named after Fredonia, New York. The first building on the town site was a general store, erected in 1868, on the southwest corner of the town square, soon followed by a simple courthouse and hotel.  The first post office was established in August 1868. The Gold Dust Hotel was completed in 1885.

It became a booming town with an emphasis on large industry. In May 1913, a large vein of semi-anthracite coal was discovered near the town.  The coal that was found was “said to be of better quality than any other found in Kansas” at that time. With this discovery, it had the possibility of bringing in large amounts of money for the Wilson County area. A cement plant opened in Fredonia in 1907, supplying jobs to the community for more than 100 years, before it was closed in 2012. The economy in Fredonia was again boosted by the Archer Daniels Midland Company. The plant was obtained in 1928 and operated as a soybean processing facility and supplied many jobs for the growing industrial town. In March 2003 the plant announced it would close its Fredonia branch effective immediately. At one time, Fredonia was a hub for oil and natural gas development.

Geography

Climate
The area climate is characterized by hot, humid summers and generally mild to cool winters.  According to the Köppen Climate Classification system, Fredonia has a humid subtropical climate, abbreviated "Cfa" on climate maps. On July 18, 1936, Fredonia set the Kansas record high temperature of 121 °F. This record was later tied by Alton, Kansas.

In late June and early July 2007, Fredonia was one of several communities in Southeast Kansas to experience record flooding. On the night of June 29, at least 10 inches of rainfall was recorded and additional rainfall fell over the weekend of June 30 and July 1.  On the night of June 30, a Topeka television station reported on its website that 100 people in Wilson County had lost their homes due to the flooding.

Demographics

2000 census
As of the census of 2000, there were 2,600 people, 1,135 households, and 703 families residing in the city. The racial makeup of the city was 96.27% White, 0.38% African American, 0.85% Native American, 0.54% Asian, 0.08% Pacific Islander, 0.58% from other races, and 1.31% from two or more races. Hispanic or Latino of any race were 2.50% of the population.

There were 1,135 households, out of which 27.8% had children under the age of 18 living with them, 50.0% were married couples living together, 9.3% had a female householder with no husband present, and 38.0% were non-families. 35.6% of all households were made up of individuals, and 21.7% had someone living alone who was 65 years of age or older. The average household size was 2.22 and the average family size was 2.88.

In the city, the population was spread out, with 24.1% under the age of 18, 7.8% from 18 to 24, 24.2% from 25 to 44, 20.1% from 45 to 64, and 23.7% who were 65 years of age or older. The median age was 41 years. For every 100 females, there were 88.1 males. For every 100 females age 18 and over, there were 82.9 males.

The median income for a household in the city was $25,539, and the median income for a family was $34,459. Males had a median income of $28,657 versus $19,231 for females. The per capita income for the city was $14,593. About 8.6% of families and 12.2% of the population were below the poverty line, including 13.7% of those under age 18 and 8.7% of those age 65 or over.

2010 census
As of the census of 2010, there were 2,482 people, 1,048 households, and 630 families residing in the city. The racial makeup of the city was 95.4% White, 0.1% African American, 1.6% Native American, 0.4% Asian, 0.1% Pacific Islander, 0.2% from other races, and 2.1% from two or more races. Hispanic or Latino of any race were 3.2% of the population.

There were 1,048 households, of which 30.4% had children under the age of 18 living with them, 45.9% were married couples living together, 9.6% had a female householder with no husband present, 4.6% had a male householder with no wife present, and 39.9% were non-families. 35.4% of all households were made up of individuals, and 20.2% had someone living alone who was 65 years of age or older. The average household size was 2.29 and the average family size was 2.97.

The median age in the city was 40.5 years. 24.8% of residents were under the age of 18; 7.4% were between the ages of 18 and 24; 22.8% were from 25 to 44; 23.5% were from 45 to 64; and 21.8% were 65 years of age or older. The gender makeup of the city was 48.1% male and 51.9% female.

Economy

Top employers
List of top employers in Fredonia:

Government
Fredonia is classified as a second class city of Kansas, thus the city has a mayor-commission body with an elected mayor and two elected commissioners.  The commissioners are not vested with any supervisory powers over specific departments.  The city commission appoints a city administrator, who is responsible for the day-to-day administration of all city officers and employees.

The mayor of Fredonia is Bob McKenney.  Bill Jones and Brandon Tindle are the two elected commissioners.  Kelley Zellner is the City Administrator of Fredonia.

Education
The community is served by Fredonia USD 484 public school district.  The mascot for each of the district's two schools is the yellowjacket.

Notable people
 Marcus B. Bell, U.S. Army brigadier general
 George Malone, (1890–1961), US Senator of Nevada, World War I veteran, civil engineer.
 Don Myers, member of the Kansas House of Representatives.
 Benjamin Paulen, (1869–1961), 23rd Governor of Kansas.
 Charles Stokes, (1902-1996), Member of the Washington House of Representatives
 Kendall Trainor, (born 1967), All-American placekicker for the University of Arkansas.

References

Further reading

External links

 City of Fredonia
 Fredonia - Directory of Public Officials
 USD 484, local school district
 Fredonia city map, KDOT

Cities in Kansas
County seats in Kansas
Cities in Wilson County, Kansas